George Walker Holden is a professor and developmental psychologist working at the Southern Methodist University, where he was the former Chair of the Psychology Department. Holden is the co-founder of the U.S. Alliance to End the Hitting of Children and the author of several books on the subject of child development.

Early life
George Holden's father was Reuben A. Holden, who was an administrator at Yale University and later become President of Warren Wilson College in Asheville, North Carolina. He received his BA from Yale University and his MA and PhD in psychology from the University of North Carolina at Chapel Hill.

Positions
George Holden served as a professor and Associate Chair of the Department of Psychology at the University of Texas at Austin. He is Professor of Psychology and former chair of the Department of Psychology at Southern Methodist University from 2015 to 2020. Holden co-founded the U.S. Alliance to End the Hitting of Children in 2011, and serves as the organization's President.  Since 2011 he has served on the board of Family Compass, a Dallas child abuse prevention non-profit, where he was board president from 2016 to 2017. He currently is on the board of the National Initiative to End Corporal Punishment (beginning in 2016) and joined the board of Nurturings (formerly Attachment Parenting International) in 2021. He has also served as the President of the Society for Research in Human Development.

Research
Holden has researched the problem of corporal punishment of children, parenting practices and cognitions, and family violence, in addition to other topics. In 2014 Holden released a study that showed evidence that parents that favor corporal punishment are prone to changing their minds on its usefulness if shown how the punishment can negatively affect their child. In addition to his research, Holden has discussed parenting and child abuse issues and controversies in the media, and has written for periodicals including the New York Times. In addition to research articles, he has published books on the subject including Parents and the Dynamics of Child Rearing, and he was the co-editor of the books Children Exposed to Marital Violence, and The Handbook of Family Measurement Techniques. He is also the author of Parenting: A Dynamic Perspective.

Honors
Holden is a fellow of the Association for Psychological Science, member of the American Professional Society on the Abuse of Children, the International Society for the Child Abuse and Neglect, and the Society for Research in Child Development. In 2018 he received the Distinguished Career Award from the International Society for the Prevention of Child Abuse and Neglect. He received the Outstanding Mentor Award from the Society for Research in Human Development in 2010.

References

Living people
Southern Methodist University faculty
University of North Carolina at Chapel Hill alumni
21st-century American psychologists
Yale University alumni
Year of birth missing (living people)